Qaleh-ye Karbalai Mohammad Ali (also Romanized as Qal‘eh-ye Karbalā’ī Moḩammad ‘Alī) is a village in Dasht-e Arzhan Rural District, Arzhan District, Shiraz County, Fars Province, Iran. At the 2006 census, its population was 32, in 10 families.

References 

Populated places in Shiraz County